Ekaterina Bychkova and Nadiya Kichenok were the defending champions, having won the event in 2013, but both players chose not to compete.

Petra Krejsová and Tereza Smitková won the tournament, defeating Michaëlla Krajicek and Aleksandra Krunić in the final, 1–6, 7–6(7–2), [11–9].

Seeds

Draw

References 
 Draw

Lale Cup - Doubles
Lale Cup